Yoshiko Honda-Mikami (born 23 May 1966) is a Japanese biathlete. She competed at the 1992 Winter Olympics and the 1994 Winter Olympics.

References

External links
 

1966 births
Living people
Biathletes at the 1992 Winter Olympics
Biathletes at the 1994 Winter Olympics
Japanese female biathletes
Olympic biathletes of Japan
Place of birth missing (living people)
Asian Games medalists in cross-country skiing
Cross-country skiers at the 1990 Asian Winter Games
Asian Games gold medalists for Japan
Asian Games silver medalists for Japan
Medalists at the 1990 Asian Winter Games
20th-century Japanese women